Franz Exner may refer to:

 Franz Exner (Austrian physicist), 1849–1926
 , 1802–1853
 Franz Exner (Austrian-German criminologist), 1881–1947